Malhamlu-ye Sofla (also Romanized as Malḩamlū-ye Soflá; also known as Malḩamlū-ye Pā'īn) is a village in Chaldoran-e Jonubi Rural District, in the Central District of Chaldoran County, West Azerbaijan Province, Iran. At the 2006 census, its population was 132, in 20 families.

References 

Populated places in Chaldoran County